The Round Island day gecko (Phelsuma guentheri), also known as Günther's gecko, is an endangered species of gecko. It lives on the islet Round Island (Mauritius), and typically dwells on different palm trees. The Round Island day gecko feeds on insects and nectar.

Etymology
The specific name, guentheri, is in honor of German-born British herpetologist Albert Günther.

Description
P. guentheri is one of the largest living day geckos. Females of this species are generally very much smaller than males. The body color is grayish or grayish brown. A dark-brown stripe extends from the nostril to above the ear opening. On the back, dark spots may be present. In some individuals, the legs and toes have light-yellow bars. The ventral side is white or yellowish.

Geographic range
P. guentheri originally occurred on Mauritius before rats and cats were introduced.

Habitat
P. guentheri is often found on bottle palms, fan palms (Latania loddigesii ), and Pandanus. Since much of the original vegetation is destroyed, by tropical cyclones, P. guentheri is forced to live in rocky crevices.

Diet
Round Island day geckos feed on various insects and other invertebrates. They also lick soft, sweet fruit, pollen, and nectar.

Reproduction
The females lay up to four pairs of eggs. The young will hatch after about 58–104 days. The juveniles measure . The eggs are laid normally in June, but can be laid from February to September.

Care and maintenance in captivity
These animals are endangered and were bred and kept by the Durrell Wildlife Conservation Trust at Durrell Wildlife Park until 1999.

References

Further reading

Boulenger GA (1885). Catalogue of the Lizards in the British Museum (Natural History). Second Edition. Volume I. Geckonidæ ... London: Trustees of the British Museum (Natural History). (Taylor and Francis, printers). xii + 436 pp. + Plates I-XXXII. (Phelsuma guentheri, new species, p. 213).
Carpenter AI, Côte IM, Jones CG (2003). "Habitat use, egg laying sites and activity patterns of an endangered Mauritian gecko (Phelsuma guentheri)". Herpetological Journal 13: 155-157.
Wheler CL, Fa JE (1995). "Enclosure Utilization and Activity of Round Island Geckos (Phelsuma guentheri)". Zoo Biology 14: 361-369.
Henkel F-W, Schmidt W (1995). Amphibien und Reptilien Madagaskars, der Maskarenen, Seychellen und Komoren. Stuttgart: Ulmer. . (in German).
McKeown, Sean (1993). The general care and maintenance of day geckos. Lakeside, California: Advanced Vivarium Systems.

Phelsuma
Reptiles of Mauritius
Reptiles described in 1885
Taxa named by George Albert Boulenger